The Autovía A-80, also known as Autovía del Suroccidente (Southwestern highway), a proposed highway in Asturias, Spain.

A-80 was initially proposed by Francisco Álvarez-Cascos, Minister of Public Works and Transport during the government of José María Aznar, as a connection of the coastal resort of Ribadesella and the Autovía A-8 with Cangas de Onís, but was discarded when José Luis Rodríguez Zapatero became Prime Minister.

Zapatero changed totally the project to a highway that will connect the A-63 at La Espina with Cangas del Narcea.

Sections

References

A-80
A-80